Cortinarius subfoetens is a basidiomycete mushroom of the genus Cortinarius native to North America.

References

subfoetens
Fungi described in 1995
Fungi of North America
Taxa named by Meinhard Michael Moser